= T. P. McAuley =

American politician

Member of the Washington House of Representatives for the 36th district
- In office 1895–1897

Personal details
- Party: Populist

T. P. McAuley was an American politician in the state of Washington. He served in the Washington House of Representatives from 1895 to 1897.
